Canada competed at the 2016 Summer Paralympics in Rio de Janeiro, Brazil, from 7 to 18 September 2016.

On August 29, 2016, a team of 162 athletes in 19 sports was announced.

Disability classifications

Every participant at the Paralympics has their disability grouped into one of five disability categories; amputation, the condition may be congenital or sustained through injury or illness; cerebral palsy; wheelchair athletes, there is often overlap between this and other categories; visual impairment, including blindness; Les autres, any physical disability that does not fall strictly under one of the other categories, for example dwarfism or multiple sclerosis. Each Paralympic sport then has its own classifications, dependent upon the specific physical demands of competition. Events are given a code, made of numbers and letters, describing the type of event and classification of the athletes competing. Some sports, such as athletics, divide athletes by both the category and severity of their disabilities, other sports, for example swimming, group competitors from different categories together, the only separation being based on the severity of the disability.

Medallists

The following Canadian competitors won medals at the Games.

| width="95%" align="left" valign="top" |

|  style="text-align:left; width:22%; vertical-align:top;"|

Archery

Athletics

Men
Track

Field

Women
Track

Field

Boccia 

Canada qualified for the 2016 Summer Paralympics in this sport at the Montreal hosted 2015 BisFed Americas Pair and Team championship in the Pairs BC4 event.  They claimed gold ahead of silver medalist Brazil and bronze medalists Colombia.

Individual

Pairs

Cycling

Road

Track

Equestrian 
The country qualified to participate in the team event at the Rio Games.

Individual

Team

Goalball

Men 
The Canada men's national goalball team qualified for the Rio Games after finishing third at the 2015 Parapan American Games.  They earned the spot because the two teams ahead of them, Brazil and the United States, had already qualified. Canada's men enter the tournament ranked 16th in the world.

Quarterfinal

Women 
The Canada women's national goalball team qualified for the Rio Games after finishing third at the 2015 Parapan American Games.  They earned the spot because the two teams ahead of them, Brazil and the United States, had already qualified. Canada's women enter the tournament ranked 6th in the world.

Quarterfinal

Judo

Paracanoeing

Canada earned a qualifying spot at the 2016 Summer Paralympics in this sport following their performance at the 2015 ICF Canoe Sprint & Paracanoe World Championships in Milan, Italy where the top six finishers in each Paralympic event earned a qualifying spot for their nation. Christine Gauthier earned the spot for Canada after finishing sixth in the women's KL2 event.

Paratriathlon

Rowing

One pathway for qualifying for Rio involved having a boat have top eight finish at the 2015 FISA World Rowing Championships in a medal event.  Canada qualified for the 2016 Games under this criterion in the LTA Mixed Coxed Four event with a third place finish in a time of 03:27.380.

Qualification Legend: FA=Final A (medal); FB=Final B (non-medal); R=Repechage

Sailing 

Canada qualified a boat for all three sailing classes at the Games through their results at the 2014 Disabled Sailing World Championships held in Halifax, Nova Scotia, Canada. Places were earned in the solo 2.4mR event, the two-person SKUD 18-class and a crew also qualified for the three-person Sonar class.

Shooting

Sitting volleyball

Women 
Canada women's national sitting volleyball team qualified for the 2016 Games at the 2015 Parapan American Games.

Squad 
 Chantal Beauchesne (St. Isidore, Ont.)
 Angelena Dolezar (Edmonton)
 Danielle Ellis (Langley, B.C.)
 Leanne Muldrew (Winnipeg)
 Jennifer Oakes (Calgary)
 Shacarra Orr (Jaffray, B.C.)
 Heidi Peters (Neerlandia, Alta.)
 Tessa Popoff (Surrey, B.C.)
 Amber Skyrpan (Wandering River, Alta.)
 Felicia Voss-Shafiq (Burnaby, B.C.)
 Jolan Wong (Pembroke, Ont.)
 Katelyn Wright (Edmonton)

Group A 

Classification 7th / 8th

Swimming 

The top two finishers in each Rio medal event at the 2015 IPC Swimming World Championships earned a qualifying spot for their country for Rio. Aurelie Rivard earned Canada a spot after winning gold in the Women's 50m Freestyle S10.

Men

Women

Table Tennis

Women

Wheelchair basketball

Men 
The Canada men's national wheelchair basketball team has qualified for the 2016 Rio Paralympics.

During the draw, Brazil had the choice of which group they wanted to be in.  They were partnered with Spain, who would be in the group Brazil did not select.  Brazil chose Group B, which included  Iran, the United States, Great Britain, Germany and Algeria.  That left Spain in Group A with Australia, Canada, Turkey, the Netherlands and Japan.

11th/12th place playoff

Women 
The Canada women's national wheelchair basketball team has qualified for the 2016 Rio Paralympics. As hosts, Brazil got to choose which group they were put into.  They were partnered with Algeria, who would be put in the group they did not chose.  Brazil chose Group A, which included Canada, Germany, Great Britain and Argentina.  Algeria ended up in Group B with the United States, the Netherlands, France and China.

Quarterfinal

5th/6th place match

Wheelchair fencing

Wheelchair rugby 

Canada national wheelchair rugby team qualified for the Rio Paralympics at the 2015 Parapan American Games after defeating the United States in the gold medal match.

Canada was scheduled to open play in Rio against Brazil on September 14.  Their second game was scheduled to be against Great Britain on September 15.  Their final game of group play as against the Australia on September 16. Canada entered the tournament ranked number four in the world.

Semifinals

Bronze Medal Match

Wheelchair tennis 
Canada qualified one competitors in the men's single event, Philippe Bedard.  This spot was a result of a Bipartite Commission Invitation place.

See also
Canada at the 2016 Summer Olympics

References

Nations at the 2016 Summer Paralympics
2016
2016 in Canadian sports